Waleran de Meullent (or de Meulan) was the eldest son and associate count of Robert II of Meulan. He married Marguerite de Fougères, daughter of Raoul II de Fougères and widow of William Bertran in 1189. He died at the siege of Acre in 1191 during the Third Crusade in the service of his overlord Richard I, King of England. Galeran's younger brother, Pierre of Beaumont-le-Roger also predeceased their father Count Robert which set up a succession problem for the honor of Meulan when Count Robert eventually died.

1191 deaths
Counts of Meulan
Christians of the Third Crusade
Galeran
Year of birth unknown